Austral Alien is the fifth full-length studio album by the Australian progressive metal band, Alchemist. It was recorded and mixed in only ten days. It was released in 2003 by Chatterbox Records in Australia and worldwide by Relapse Records. Austral Alien is semi-conceptual with a lyrical focus inspired by the Australian environment and the impact of man on the ecology. Promotional music videos for the songs "First Contact", "Solarburn" and "Alpha Capella Nova Vega" were released, with the video for "Solarburn" expressing the album's concept, using imagery from the 2003 Canberra bushfires. The cover art is influenced by Surrealism. Austral Alien featured more keyboards and a mellowing of their previous death metal guitar sound, with even shorter songs than Organasm. Allmusic suggested that "Austral Alien is for Alchemist what, say, Permanent Waves was to Rush (see the increased use of synthesizers): a work of unquestionable merit and maturity that may nevertheless leave older fans yearning just a little for the excesses – both successful and not – of albums past" and noted that this was the band's most commercially accessible release, while still praising Alchemist for their "inspired brand of sci-fi metal".

Track listing

Credits 
 Adam Agius − vocals, guitar, keyboards
 Rodney Holder − drums, triangle
 John Bray − bass guitar
 Roy Torkington − guitar, artwork, layout and design

References 

2003 albums
Alchemist (band) albums
Concept albums
Relapse Records albums